The Anhangabaú River (in Portuguese: Rio Anhangabaú) is a river of São Paulo state in southeastern Brazil.

The Anhangabaú River cuts through the very oldest part of central São Paulo, though it has been canalized since the first decade of the 20th century.

The green space and plazas above the subterranean river is a popular place for various large public gatherings, including cultural events at the annual Virada Cultural, as well as numerous political protests. On 16 April 1984 approximately 1.5 million people gathered in the Anhangabaú Valley to protest the military dictatorship.

See also
List of rivers of São Paulo

References

Brazilian Ministry of Transport

Rivers of São Paulo (state)